In Greek mythology, Thyia (Thuia derived from the verb θύω "to sacrifice") is the name two figures:

Thyia, daughter of Deucalion and mother of Magnes and Makednos by Zeus.
Thyia, a naiad who consorted with Apollo.

Notes

References 

 Herodotus, The Histories with an English translation by A. D. Godley. Cambridge. Harvard University Press. 1920. Online version at the Topos Text Project. Greek text available at Perseus Digital Library.
 Hesiod, Catalogue of Women from Homeric Hymns, Epic Cycle, Homerica translated by Evelyn-White, H G. Loeb Classical Library Volume 57. London: William Heinemann, 1914. Online version at theio.com

Women in Greek mythology
Characters in Greek mythology